Casco may refer to:

Places in the United States
Casco, Maine, a town
Casco (CDP), Maine, a census-designated place within the town
Casco Bay, a bay on the coast of Maine
Casco, Missouri, a ghost town
Casco, Wisconsin, a village
Casco (town), Wisconsin, a town
Casco Township, Allegan County, Michigan
Casco Township, St. Clair County, Michigan
Casco Peak, Colorado
Fort Casco, an English fort built in present-day Falmouth, Maine, in 1698

Ships
USS Casco, several United States Navy ships
Casco-class monitor, a class of United States Navy monitors built during the American Civil War 
Casco-class cutter, an 18-ship class of United States Coast Guard cutters in service between 1946 and 1988
USCGC Casco (WAVP-370), later WHEC-370, a United States Coast Guard cutter in commission from 1949 to 1969
Casco (barge), flat-bottomed square-ended barges from the Philippines, prevalent in the 18th and 19th centuries in Luzon

Other uses
Casco (surname), a list of people
Casco (Utrecht), a Dutch non-profit art institution
Casco (company), a Swedish chemicals manufacturer, now a part of AkzoNobel
Connecticut Automotive Specialty Company (Casco), which patented its version of an automobile auxiliary power outlet
CASCO (Central American and Caribbean Sports Organization), former name of Centro Caribe Sports
ISO/CASCO, Committee on conformity assessment, International Organization for Standardization technical committee